Michael Lloyd Hough (born February 6, 1963) is a Canadian former professional ice hockey player who played thirteen seasons in the National Hockey League from 1986 until 1999.

Biography
Hough was born in Montreal, Quebec. As a youth, he played in the 1976 Quebec International Pee-Wee Hockey Tournament with a minor ice hockey team from Toronto.

Hough was drafted 181st overall by the Quebec Nordiques in the 1982 NHL Entry Draft. He played 707 career NHL games, scoring 100 goals and 156 assists for 256 points.  He had his best season in 1991–92 with 16 goals and 22 assists for 38 points, despite being sidelined for a month with a broken thumb. He was also the Nordiques' captain during that season.

Quebec traded Hough to the Washington Capitals in exchange for Reggie Savage and Paul MacDermid on June 20, 1993. Four days later, Washington left Hough unprotected for the 1993 NHL Expansion Draft, and he was claimed by the Florida Panthers, with whom he played four seasons.  He scored the last goal in the Spectrum, in double overtime of the fifth game of the Panthers' semifinals series against the Philadelphia Flyers in 1996. He ended his NHL career with the New York Islanders in 1999 after signing with them as a free agent on July 2, 1997.

Career statistics

References

External links
 

1963 births
Living people
Anglophone Quebec people
Canadian expatriate ice hockey players in the United States
Canadian ice hockey left wingers
Florida Panthers players
Fredericton Express players
Halifax Citadels players
Ice hockey people from Montreal
Kitchener Rangers players
Lowell Lock Monsters players
New York Islanders players
Quebec Nordiques draft picks
Quebec Nordiques players
Utah Grizzlies (IHL) players